Desert Vista High School is a public high school located in the Ahwatukee area of Phoenix, Arizona. Opened in 1996, it is the second Tempe Union High School District (TUHSD) school in Ahwatukee and serves approximately 3,000 students.

Academics

Statistics 
During the 2020-2021 academic year, 2,779 students attended the school, constituting 21.6% of Tempe Union High School District's population. Due to the demographic makeup of Ahwatukee, which is overwhelmingly Caucasian, the school is noted to have a bigger proportion of Caucasian students than other comparable high schools, even Mountain Pointe High School. According to data from the 2020–2021 academic year, 58.1% of the school's student population are classified as Caucasian. Students classified as "Hispanics" form the second biggest demographic bloc, constituting 21.3% of the school's population.

In 2022, Desert Vista received an "A" rating from the Arizona Department of Education with the highest score of any traditional public, non-magnet high school. According to Public School Review, Desert Vista ranks in the top 10% in Arizona in math proficiency, reading proficiency, and graduation rate.  In 2021, U.S. News & World Report noted that the school's Advanced Placement participation rate is 25% with a passage rate of 84%.

Extracurricular activities

Athletics 
Desert Vista is an Arizona Interscholastic Association (AIA) member school offering boys and girls sports complying with Title IX. Student athletes can participate in varsity, junior varsity, and freshmen only teams as well as individual sports under the AIA's 6A Conference. Desert Vista Athletics consist of several sports. Desert Vista has won many state championships across a wide variety of sports.

 Badminton
 Baseball - State Champions 1999, 2001
 Basketball (Boys and Girls) - State Champions (Boys) - 2008, 2020 (Girls) - 2014, 2023
 Cheer (Girls and Coed)
 Cross Country (Boys and Girls) - State Champions (Boys) - 2002, 2005, 2006, 2008, 2012, 2013, 2014, 2015, 2016, 2017, 2018, 2021 State Champions (Girls) - 1998, 2000, 2013, 2014, 2016, 2019, 2020
 Football - State Champions - 1998, 2011
 Golf (Boys and Girls) - State Champions (Boys) - 2016
 Ice hockey (Boys) - State Champions - 2023
 Lacrosse (Boys and Girls)
 Soccer (Boys and Girls) - State Champions (Boys) - 2002, 2005, 2006, 2018, 2022 State Champions (Girls) - 2005, 2016
 Softball
 Swim and Dive (Boys and Girls) - State Champions (Girls) - 2013, 2016
 Tennis (Boys and Girls)
 Track and field (Boys and Girls) - State Champions (Boys) - 2007, 2008, 2009, 2015 State Champions (Girls) - 1999, 2004
 Volleyball (Boys and Girls) - State Champions (Boys) - 2007, State Champions (Girls) 2014, 2015
 Wrestling

Speech and Debate 
In 2022, the Desert Vista High School Speech and Debate Team won its 18th state championship, which is the most in Arizona history.

Marching Band 
The Desert Vista Thunder Marching band is run by director Michael J Krill. The director of percussion is Vicente Lopez. The marching band has won many competitions, being 9-time champions for the state of Arizona. Marching band is a half semester, zero hour class and one semester of fine art credits can be earned by taking the course. The class can be worth one year of P.E. credit if taken for three years.

Controversies 
Desert Vista High School has been at the center of several controversies since its opening that have garnered local, national, and even international media attention.

Allegations of records falsification 
In 2001, the school's registrar at the time, Jane Jones, accused then principal Joe McDonald of approaching three teachers at the schools to change the grades for a student-athlete who was being recruited, but was ineligible to compete at a Division I school. McDonald allegedly approached the teachers after being asked by then-Tempe Union High School District Superintendent James Buchanan to see what can be done to help the student. School district administrators admitted four years later, in 2005, that grades were changed for the softball student-athlete two months after her graduation, after which she was cleared by the National Collegiate Athletic Association to play at Texas A&M University–Corpus Christi.

In 2002, Jones was given her first negative evaluation of her career, and was subsequently fired on McDonald's recommendation. Following her termination, Jones filed a wrongful termination lawsuit under the state's whistleblower protection law, alleging that she was fired because McDonald said she was "not a team player." Subsequently, Jones claimed the school district officials also engaged in retaliation following her dismissal by claiming she was not eligible for rehiring to an investigator working for a California-based reference checking company, thus allegedly implying she has committed wrongdoing. Arizona school districts have no power to determine rehire eligibility, as only the state's Board of Education has the authority to suspend or revoke a person's teaching credentials. A$140,000 settlement between the district and Jones was approved by a judge in 2006.

Alleged preferential treatment of student-athletes 
In 2004, the school's basketball program came under scrutiny as school records showed that player Xavier Kirby did not attend 247 classes during the first three-quarters of the 2003–04 school year, yet remained eligible for varsity team. In the same report on Kirby's absences, the East Valley Tribune reported that a former school varsity football player, Chris Snow, claimed he was paid by the school district to tutor other student athletes on the team, and in the case of one football player he helped tutor, Snow claims he did 70% to 80% of the work for the player, in an arrangement made to ensure the player remains eligible for football.

District officials say while the district has a peer tutor program, the district does not pay tutors. The East Valley Tribune, however, claims that Snow's allegations were confirmed by two other sources, which were not identified by name. Snow would later clarify his statement to the East Valley Tribune, and the district would later investigate Kilby's absences.

Allegations of racial harassment 
In 2005, security guard Loretta Avent filed a discrimination charge with the Equal Employment Opportunity Commission against McDonald, accusing him of retaliation after she coordinated a meeting that exposed Native American students' claims of harassment by students, in addition to unfair treatment by teachers. During that meeting, which took place in April, 36 parents, students and tribal leaders with the Gila River Indian Community met with school and district leaders to talk about allegations of racial discrimination and harassment, including claims of racial profiling, being called "savages", and inaction by teachers to rectify the problems.

After the aforementioned meeting, which took place in April, Tempe Union High School District received a letter from four women, demanding an investigation into allegations of racial bias against the school's African American students, including unfair grading practices and a student assault, among other claims.

Closed door mediation sessions were later held with school district officials, school administrators, Gila River Indian Community Lt. Gov. Mary Thomas, and US Attorney Paul Charlton, which resulted in sensitivity training for faculty and the creation of a Native American Club on campus.

Allegations of sexual harassment involving staff member 
In 2005, reports surfaced that the school's former football coach, Jim Rattay, was accused by female students of engaging in unprofessional conduct.

According to a report compiled by district officials, Rattay, in one incident, asked a 14-year-old female student to walk to the front of the class, and read, out loud, passages from a pamphlet about teen pregnancy and sexually transmitted diseases. Rattay claimed to the class that he had seen the girl's name in the boys' bathroom. The girl, who was not identified, claimed that Rattay made false claims that she had white marks on her lips or chin, after she read a passage from the pamphlet about herpes, after which the students interpreted the comment to mean that the girl in question either engaged on oral sex or had herpes. The girl also claimed that Rattay made another false comment about her promiscuity as she sat down.

School district officials, in their report, claimed that an investigation of Rattay found "insufficient evidence" to support allegations of sexual harassment.

In a separate, unrelated complaint, Rattay was accused of calling another female student "ugly", and making other comments about her appearance. The school district later disciplined Rattay, but did not reveal details of the disciplinary actions taken. In 2009, the Phoenix New Times revealed that Rattay was suspended without pay for 10 days from his role as the head of the school's Physical Education Department.

Former teacher sues over alleged racially motivated incidents 
In 2014, former teacher Cicely D. Cobb sued the school district and then principal Anna Battle, alleging a number of racially motivated incidents, some of which targeted African Americans at the school, had taken place. Cobb accused school administration of inaction, following a number of incidents.

Seniors spell out racial slur with shirts 
In 2016, the school made headlines over an incident that took place after a panoramic picture session for the graduating seniors. The students wore shirts which together spelled out "BEST*YOU'VE*EVER*SEEN*CLASS*OF*2016", but a separate picture was taken of six female students, who arranged the shirts in such a way that it spelled out the racial slur nigger, with the two "G"s in the middle replaced with the asterisks. The picture of the students quickly spread over social media and garnered a significant backlash, and the incident received national and global attention.

School district officials condemned the incident via a statement, and the female students involved were given 10-day suspensions. In addition, the students would complete their courses through the district's online learning option, in a disciplinary action some described as "mini-expulsion". At least one of the students reportedly had an offer to play soccer at Northern Arizona University withdrawn.

The incident reportedly sparked confrontations on campus. One incident, which involved a student trying to stop another student from being interviewed by a television reporter with Phoenix ABC affiliate KNXV-TV, was captured on camera. Subsequent protests related to the controversy also saw counter-protesters who, according to at least one account, used the word "nigger" against the protesters, while calling on them to "stay on their side of the mountain".

Three months after the incident, the school, along with the school district, held school assemblies and class workshops to address diversity and social media, among other topics. The incident was thrust back into the media-cycle when the school's yearbook contained an article. Ultimately DVHS offered two yearbooks, one with subsequent article and the other with the corresponding pages glued together.

Social media firearm threat 
In 2018, The Phoenix Police Department announced that a social media threat had been made towards Desert Vista High School. The threat featured a picture of a rifle, which was later found to be copied and pasted from the website of a gun store. It was later determined that the threat had come from outside of the United States, nor was the account created by a Desert Vista student.  The school continued to operate normally throughout the day, although some police officers were placed on campus. Desert Vista administrators respectfully asked parents to not visit the school to take their students out of class, as it could pose a further safety risk to students and faculty.

Mexican border senior prank 
In 2019, the school once again found itself at the center of a racism controversy, after a tweet made by a Twitter account titled "Desert Vista Senior Prank" implied that graduating seniors will pretend the front gate to the high school is the border into Mexico, with "cops searching cars, window washers, and people selling tortillas." School district officials distanced themselves from the tweet, and said the prank will not take place. In addition, a notice was sent to parents that called the tweets "insensitive and thoughtless and absolutely unacceptable."

Notable alumni
 Kristine Anigwe, 2015: WNBA player for the Connecticut Sun
 Jaycob Brugman, MLB outfielder for the Baltimore Orioles
 Brandon Clarke, 2015: NBA forward for the Memphis Grizzlies
 Max Crumm, 2003: actor and singer
 J. J. Dielman, 2012: NFL guard for the Cincinnati Bengals
 Kimiko Glenn, 2007: Actress known for her role as Brook Soso on Orange is the New Black
 Rio Gomez, baseball player
 Jalen Jelks, NFL defensive end for the Dallas Cowboys
Dani Jones, 2015: All-American and 4-time NCAA National Champion distance runner for the University of Colorado.
 Mark Kastelic, professional ice hockey player
 Devon Kennard, NFL linebacker for the Arizona Cardinals and real estate entrepreneur
 Zach Miller, 2004:  American football player, Super Bowl XLVIII champion for the Seattle Seahawks
 Jessica Nigri, cosplayer, promotional model, and voice actress
 Sarah Pauly, 2001: All-American and NPF professional softball player
 Bobby Wade, 1999: professional American football player

References

External links
Official Website

Public high schools in Arizona
Educational institutions established in 1996
High schools in Phoenix, Arizona
1996 establishments in Arizona